Franz von Assisi Karl Friedrich Klemens Jaroslav Alois Leopold Gerhard Telesphorus Odilius Johann Bosco Paul Marie, Prince von Lobkowicz (5 January 1948 – 17 February 2022) was a Czech Roman Catholic prelate. Lobkowicz served as titular bishop of Catabum Castra and as auxiliary bishop of the Roman Catholic Archdiocese of Prague, Czech Republic from 1990 to 1996. He was then appointed the first bishop of Roman Catholic Diocese of Ostrava-Opava, Czech Republic, serving from 1996 until his death. 

Lobkowicz died on 17 February 2022, at the age of 74.

References

1948 births
2022 deaths
People from Plzeň
Premonstratensian bishops
20th-century Roman Catholic bishops in the Czech Republic
21st-century Roman Catholic bishops in the Czech Republic
Czech nobility
Frantisek Vaclav